Aristolochia preussii, synonym Pararistolochia preussii, is a species of plant in the family Aristolochiaceae. It is native to Cameroon, Equatorial Guinea, Gabon, and Ivory Coast. Its natural habitat is subtropical or tropical dry forests. It was assessed as "critically endangered" and threatened by habitat loss in the 2000 IUCN Red List, where it is said to be native only to Cameroon. , Plants of the World Online gives it a wider distribution.

References

preusii
Flora of Cameroon
Flora of Equatorial Guinea
Flora of Gabon
Flora of Ivory Coast
Critically endangered plants
Taxonomy articles created by Polbot